John Taliaferro "Jay" West IV (born November 29, 1964) is an American politician. He has been a member of the South Carolina House of Representatives from the 7th District since 2016. He is a member of the Republican Party.

Electoral history

References

External links
 Jay West at Vote Smart

Living people
1964 births
Erskine College alumni
Republican Party members of the South Carolina House of Representatives
21st-century American politicians